Lost On Venus is a science fantasy novel by American writer Edgar Rice Burroughs, the second book in the Venus series (sometimes called the "Carson Napier of Venus series" or the "Amtor series"). It was first serialized in the magazine Argosy in 1933 and published in book form two years later.

Copyright
The copyright for this story has expired in Australia, and thus now resides in the public domain there.  The text is available via Project Gutenberg Australia.

External links
"Lost On Venus" in ERBzine's ERB C.H.A.S.E.R. Bibliography 
 
Free Ebook from Project Gutenberg of Australia
Edgar Rice Burroughs Summary Project page for Lost on Venus

1935 fantasy novels
1935 science fiction novels
1935 American novels
American fantasy novels
American science fiction novels
Novels first published in serial form
Venus novels by Edgar Rice Burroughs
Works originally published in Argosy (magazine)